Crassispira hosoi is a species of sea snail, a marine gastropod mollusk in the family Pseudomelatomidae.

Description

Distribution
This marine species occurs off Japan

References

 Hasegawa K. (2009) Upper bathyal gastropods of the Pacific coast of northern Honshu, Japan, chiefly collected by R/V Wakataka-maru. In: T. Fujita (ed.), Deep-sea fauna and pollutants off Pacific coast of northern Japan. National Museum of Nature and Science Monographs 39: 225-383
 Hasegawa K. & Okutani T. (2011) A review of bathyal shell-bearing gastropods in Sagami Bay. Memoirs of the National Sciences Museum, Tokyo 47: 97-144.

External links
 

hosoi
Gastropods described in 1964